Give and Take (Live) is a live album by South African singer-songwriter and record producer Zonke. It was recorded on 5 July 2013 at the Lyric Centre, Golden Reef City, Johannesburg and features live performances recorded from 2007 to 2012.

Commercial reception
Give and Take (Live) was certified gold upon selling over 20,000 units sold under two months.

Track listing

Release history

Accolades

References

Zonke albums
2013 live albums
Live albums by South African artists